Rubén Juan Cepeda Vergara (born 17 June 1994) is a Chilean footballer who last played for Lautaro de Buin as a midfielder.

Honours
Deportes Temuco
Primera B: 2015–16

References

External links

1994 births
Living people
People from Quilpué
Chilean footballers
Chilean Primera División players
Primera B de Chile players
Segunda División Profesional de Chile players
Universidad de Chile footballers
Deportes Temuco footballers
Lautaro de Buin footballers
Association football midfielders